Doublegate is a neighborhood within the city of Albany in Dougherty County, Georgia, United States. The neighborhood consists of residential streets surrounding the Doublegate Country Club.

Churches
There a number of churches in Doublegate, including Northgate Presbyterian Church, Church of Christ Beattie Road, St Patrick's Episcopal Church, and Christ United Methodist Church.

External links

Unincorporated communities in Georgia (U.S. state)
Unincorporated communities in Dougherty County, Georgia
Albany metropolitan area, Georgia